Financial social work is an interactive and introspective, multidisciplinary approach that helps individuals explore and address their unconscious feelings, thoughts and attitudes about money. This self-examination process enables people to improve their relationship with their money and thus establish healthier money habits that lead to improved financial circumstances.

History 

Reeta Wolfsohn, CMSW, created financial social work. She is the founder and president of the Center for Financial Social Work. Financial social work originally evolved from Wolfsohn's work with women and the term femonomics, a term she coined in 1997. Femonomics expanded into financial social work in 2005, an approach that leads both men and women in the direction of financial wellbeing.

Wolfsohn brought the behavioral financial social work model to the University of Maryland as a continuing education training in 2008 and then as a graduate level course in January 2009. The University of Maryland School of Social Work developed a financial social work initiative (FSWI) to prepare social work graduates to help clients improve their financial capability through continuing education courses, a graduate level elective course, out-of-classroom offerings, and paid field placements that address financial issues at the individual and community level.

The Center for Financial Social Work's certification curriculum has been taught as an online elective class at the University of Kentucky since 2011.

Disconnect from money 

Consumerism features an increasingly cashless society with payment options including checks, credit cards, debit cards, money orders, small dollar loans and store-value cards, as well as various direct deposit methods for income and benefits. When individuals have less direct and physical contact with their money, they disconnect from it. This prevents them from knowing or understanding how much money they have, or how their spending impacts their financial circumstances.

Determinants of financial behavior 

Individuals' financial behavior is influenced by many internal and external factors. Internal elements include individual psychology, family history and environment Parents' values and beliefs on the importance of saving vs. spending and overall materialism impact their children's money values and beliefs; they transmit these money lessons primarily through modeling and discussion. External factors include media, markets, peers, culture, and social mood. In addition, self-worth, net worth and social signaling play a role on individuals' purchasing habits.

People with limited funds, or those trying to keep up with another's lifestyle often suffer from low self-esteem. This results in feeling unworthy of a better financial future and behaving in self-sabotaging ways such as overspending on high-status items.

Improved financial circumstances require increased self-awareness because every financial decision is impacted by an individual's thoughts, feelings and attitudes about money which are often more unconscious than conscious. The Financial Social Work model incorporates the transformative learning approach to expand self-awareness, sense of self and provide financial knowledge. As individuals gain more insight into why and how their thoughts and attitudes about money developed, they are more likely to make deep, long-lasting financial choices that positively impact their future.

They then pursue their individual path to financial wellbeing according to where they are in the life cycle and their readiness/willingness to change, as per the Transtheoretical Model of Behavior Change (TTM).  In addition, ongoing education, motivation and support are provided as part of the Financial Social Work package, thereby maximizing the likelihood of the optimal results.

Professional development 

Historically, the majority of undergraduate and graduate social work programs have not included financial literacy or courses in personal finances. That is changing due to nearly two-thirds (65%) of 130 university program survey participants being very interested in developing or expanding student competency in financial capability, and with the University of Maryland's Financial Social Work Initiative, the Center for Financial Social Work's self-study certification process (recognized by the National Association of Social Workers (NASW)), and the 2016 launch of the Council on Social Work Education (CSWE) of the Clearinghouse for Economic Well-Being in Social Work Education to support these efforts.

See also 
 Financial deepening
 Financial inclusion

References

Further reading
 
 
 
 
 
 

Personal finance education